The 2018 Oceania Sevens Championship was the eleventh Oceania Sevens in men's rugby sevens. It was held at ANZ Stadium in Suva, Fiji on 9–10 November. Host nation Fiji won the tournament, defeating New Zealand by 17–12 in the final.

Tonga finished fifth and, as the highest-placed side without core status on the World Rugby Sevens Series, won berths to the Sydney Sevens and Hamilton Sevens for 2019. Tonga also joined the sixth-placed Cook Islands as Oceania's representatives for the 2019 Hong Kong Sevens qualifying tournament for the 2020 World Series.

Teams
Participating nations for the 2018 tournament was almost the same as the previous year with Niue replacing American Samoa in the teams being entered:

Pool stage
The draw for the pool stage was done by a random order with the top four seeds being set as the top team in each of the four pools with the remaining spots in the draw being done by bands (5-8th, 9-12th).

Pool A

Pool B

Pool C

Pool D

Knockout stage
9th-12th Place

5th-8th Place
{{Round8-with third|RD3=Fifth Place|Consol=Seventh Place

|10 November 2018 – 11:00
||19||7
|10 November 2018 – 11:21
||47||0
|10 November 2018 – 11:42
||19||12
|10 November 2018 – 12:03
||38||0|10 November 2018 – 14:30
||17||5
|10 November 2018 – 14:51
||19||14

|10 November 2018 - 18:34
||29||12

|10 November 2018 - 17:52
||28||12
}}Championship'''

Placings

Source: World Rugby

References

2018
2018 rugby sevens competitions
2018 in Oceanian rugby union
2018 in Fijian rugby union
International rugby union competitions hosted by Fiji
Sport in Suva